Richard Bienert (September 5, 1881 – February 2, 1949) was a Czech high-ranking police officer and politician. He served as prime minister of the Protectorate of Bohemia and Moravia from January 19 to May 5, 1945. After World War II he was sentenced to prison for collaboration with Nazis.

Career 
Born in Prague, Bienert came from a family of magistrates clerks from that city and after he finished law studies at Prague University he also entered the state service. Some of his ancestors were of German-Bohemian ethnic descent and had assimilated into Czech society. From 1906 he worked as a police official for police in Prague and in January 1918 he even became a clerk in the Presidium of the Police in Prague. During World War I Bienert cooperated closely with the Czech resistance movement and after the proclamation of Czechoslovak independence in October 1918 he was rewarded with an appointment to the position of Prague Police Director. Later in the 1930s he also became the Provincial President in the Land of Bohemia.

After the German occupation of Czechoslovakia in 1939, he was briefly arrested by the Germans but soon released in exchange for a pledge of loyalty. In 1942, after prime minister Eliáš got arrested by Heydrich, Bienert was appointed to minister of interior under the new prime minister Jaroslav Krejčí. In 1945 Bienert replaced Krejčí in this position and at the same time also served as the substitute for seriously ill president Hácha.

In an agreement with state secretary Frank, Bienert tried to broadcast the statement on the dissolution of the Protectorate (which should be replaced by Czech puppet state still controlled by Germans) on 5 May 1945. However the same morning the Prague uprising broke out and Bienert was captured by insurgents in the broadcasting room of City Hall.

After the end of World War II, Bienert was tried for treason and collaboration with the Nazis, but because of many mitigating circumstances he was sentenced to only three years in prison. Due to poor health, he was released prematurely in 1947, and died in Prague two years later.

External links
 Biography 
  

1881 births
1949 deaths
Politicians from Prague
People from the Kingdom of Bohemia
Prime Ministers of the Protectorate of Bohemia and Moravia
Czech people of German descent
Czech anti-communists
Czech collaborators with Nazi Germany
Czech fascists
Czechoslovak prisoners and detainees
Prisoners and detainees of Czechoslovakia
National Partnership politicians